Francesco Rossi may refer to:
 Francesco Rossi (DJ), Italian disc jockey and record producer
 Francesco Rossi (footballer, born 1977), Italian goalkeeper
 Francesco Rossi (footballer, born 1991), Italian goalkeeper
 Francesco Rossi (Archbishop of Ferrara), Archbishop of Ferrara from 1919 to 1929
 Francesco de' Rossi (1510–1563), Italian Mannerist painter
 Francesco Rossi (composer) (born 1625), Italian composer

See also
Rossi (surname)
 Francesco Rosi (1922-2015), Italian film director